Hu Yukun  (1885 – May 24, 1946) was a military leader in the Republic of China. He belonged to the Fengtian clique, and was Zhang Xueliang's confidant. Eventually he became an important commander during the Wang Jingwei regime (Republic of China-Nanjing, known also as Reorganised National Government of China). His courtesy name was Lingchen. He was born in Haicheng, area of control of the General of Shengjing (now Liaoning).

Biography 
Hu Yukun won promotion in the Fengtian clique, later he was appointed Commander to the 4th Mixed Brigade of the 1st Division which Li Jinglin commanded in 1925. The next year, Li was ruined because of attempting anti-Zhang Zuolin's action. Li's Army was reorganized to the 16th Army and the 17th Army of Anguojun, Hu Yukun was catapulted to be Commander of the 17th Army.

On June 4, 1928, Zhang Zuolin was assassinated by the Kwantung Army, and his son Zhang Xueliang succeeded him. Hu Yukun was transferred to the post of Councilor of the Headquarters, Northeast Border Defence Army. The next year, requisition of the Chinese Eastern Railway by Zhang Xueliang led to an armed conflict between Zhang and the Soviet Union. Hu was appointed Commander of the 2nd Army of the Defense Forces against Russia. In 1930 Central Plains War broke out, Hu was appointed Commander of the 3rd Army of the Subjugation Forces, and attacked the Anti-Chiang Kai-shek's Army.

In May 1933 Hu Yukun was appointed a member to the Beiping Branch of the Nationalist Government's Military Commission. In April 1935 he became corresponding lieutenant general. In December he was appointed a member of the Hebei–Chahar Political Council. In December 1936, shortly after Zhang Xueliang triggered off the Xi'an Incident, Hu also supported Chiang's capture by Zhang. But after this incident, Zhang in turn was arrested by Chiang, so Hu fell from Chiang's favour.

In 1938, Hu Yukun was invited to participate in the Wang Jingwei's group by Bao Wenyue who was Hu's colleague. Hu also participated to this group. In March 1940 the Wang Jingwei regime was established, Hu was appointed a member of the Military Committee. The next month, he became Security Commander of the Border Area between Jiangsu and Henan. In 1943 he was appointed a member of the Military Commission to Northern China, and bestowed the rank of General. In next March he was appointed Director General for Northern China. In April 1945 he was appointed Chief of the General Staff of the Military Committee.

After the Wang Jingwei regime had collapsed, Hu Yukun was arrested by Chiang Kai-shek's National Government. He was convicted of treason and surrender to the enemy (namely Hanjian) and sentenced to death by a military tribunal He was executed by firing squad at Nanjing on May 24, 1946.

References

Footnotes 
 
 
 

1885 births
1946 deaths
Republic of China warlords from Liaoning
National Revolutionary Army generals from Liaoning
Military personnel of the Republic of China in the Second Sino-Japanese War
Executed Chinese collaborators with Imperial Japan
Kuomintang collaborators with Imperial Japan
People from Haicheng, Liaoning
Politicians from Anshan